Prior to the 2017 election, only the Conservatives
and Venstre had held the mayor's position in the municipality. However, in the 2017 election, local party Nytgribskov had managed to win the mayor's position after an agreement with the Social Democrats and the Red–Green Alliance.

In this election, Conservatives would become the largest party, the first time for the party in the municipality. However, Bent Hansen from Venstre managed to get a majority supporting him as the mayor. The agremeent would be with the Social Democrats, the Danish Social Liberal Party, Nytgribskov, the Green Left and Red–Green Alliance.

Electoral system
For elections to Danish municipalities, a number varying from 9 to 31 are chosen to be elected to the municipal council. The seats are then allocated using the D'Hondt method and a closed list proportional representation.
Gribskov Municipality had 23 seats in 2021

Unlike in Danish General Elections, in elections to municipal councils, electoral alliances are allowed.

Electoral alliances  

Electoral Alliance 1

Electoral Alliance 2

Electoral Alliance 3

Results

Notes

References 

Gribskov
Politics of Denmark